In the Episcopal monastic tradition, diurnum is a name for the midday service of the Divine Office, which is usually the second of four services. It is alternatively known as 'Noonday' or 'Sext'.

See also
Canonical hours
Vigil (liturgy)
Book of Hours

Little Hours